Retiro is a station on Line C of the Buenos Aires Underground and is the current terminus.  The station is a part of the larger Retiro railway station which connects to the Mitre, San Martín and Belgrano railways, as well as their corresponding commuter rail lines. The station was opened on 6 February 1936 as part of the extension of the line from Diagonal Norte.

Overview
Once complete, both line  and line  will also terminate here and connect with this station. As of 2014, Line E's extension to Retiro was almost complete, missing only rails and electrical components.

Gallery

See also
Retiro bus station
Retiro railway station (Belgrano, Mitre, San Martín)
Retiro underground station (Line E, Line G, Line H)

References

External links

Buenos Aires Underground stations
Railway stations opened in 1936
1936 establishments in Argentina